, also known as KTK, is a Japanese broadcast network affiliated with the Nippon News Network (NNN) and Nippon Television Network System (NNS). Their headquarters are located in Ishikawa Prefecture.

History
1990  April It was set up third broadcasting station of Ishikawa Prefecture.
2006  July Digital terrestrial television was started (Kanazawa Main Station).

Stations

Analog Stations 
Kanazawa(Main Station) JOWX-TV 33ch 10 kW
Hegura 42ch 10w
Suzu 41ch 200w
Noto 31ch 3w
Machino 45ch 3w
Wajima 19ch 100w
Higashi-Monzen 39ch 10w & 51ch 1w
Togi 36ch 30w
Nanao 57ch 300w
Nanao-Nadaura 41ch 30w
Noto-Kashima 45ch 10w
Hakui 42ch 100w
Tsubata-Takehashi 53ch 0.1w
Tsubata-Minaminakajo 53ch 0.1w
Kanazawa-Kamiyachi 52 ch 0.1 W
Kanazawa-Gosho 39 ch 1 W
Kanazawa-Udatsuyama 57 ch 30 W
Nabetani 62 ch 0.1 W
Tsurugi 31 ch 3 W
Torigoe 57 ch 10 W
Yoshinodani-Senami 35 ch 0.1 W
Hakusanshita 54 ch 0.1 W
Oguchi 48 ch 3 W
Shiramine 60 ch 1 W
Komatsu-Kanahira 53 ch 0.1 W
Awazu 57 ch 1 W
Katayamazu 42 ch 0.1 W
Katayamazu-minami 44 ch 0.1 W
Kaga-Higashitaniguchi 52 ch 0.1 W
Daiseiji  31 ch 10 W
Yamanaka 49 ch 3 W
Shioya 53 ch 3 W
Monzen-Kuresaka 60 ch 1 W
Monzen-Minazuki 42 ch 0.5 W
Komatsu-Ogoya 53 ch 0.1 W

Digital Stations(ID:4)
Kanazawa(Main Station) JOWX-DTV 17ch

Programs

Rival Stations 
Hokuriku Broadcasting Company(MRO)
Ishikawa TV(ITC)
Hokuriku Asahi Broadcasting(HAB)

Other Links
TVkanazawa

Television stations in Japan
Nippon News Network
Television channels and stations established in 1990
1990 establishments in Japan
Mass media in Kanazawa, Ishikawa